is a Japanese former professional baseball outfielder. He played for the Chunichi Dragons.

He is currently the second team hitting coach for the Chunichi Dragons in Japan's Nippon Professional Baseball.

Career
Ishii was drafted out of Tokai University in the third round of the 1977 draft and has been a part of the Chunichi Dragons front and back office since his retirement in 1987.

On 28 September 2019, it was confirmed that Ishii would not be offered a contract as a coach for the 2020 season.

External links

References

1955 births
Living people
Tokai University alumni
Baseball people from Kanagawa Prefecture
People from Miura, Kanagawa
Japanese baseball players
Nippon Professional Baseball catchers
Chunichi Dragons players
Japanese baseball coaches
Nippon Professional Baseball coaches